Otis Grant (born December 23, 1967) is a Canadian retired boxer. As an amateur he won a silver medal for Canada at the 1987 Pan American Games, losing to Cuba's Angel Espinosa in the final. He is a two-time North American Boxing Federation (NABF) middleweight title holder, as well as recognized for being the first black Quebecer to win a WBO championship.

Early life
Born in Saint Ann, Jamaica, Otis and his family moved to Montreal in 1977, when he was 9 years old. A multi sport athlete, he began boxing at age 11 alongside his older brother Howard, and earned the nickname “Magic” from family members who related his basketball ability to hall of famer Magic Johnson. At 17 years old, Grant had won the Canadian Senior Amateur Boxing Championships (CSABC) in his weight division of 71 kilos (156.5 pounds). This would propel him to compete at the World Youth Championship for the Canadian national team, despite his junior status. Later on, Otis competed at the 1987 Pan American Games, earning a silver medal by being defeated in the finals against Cuba's Angel Espinosa, before turning pro.

Professional career
Known as "Magic", Grant turned pro in 1988 and captured the vacant WBO middleweight title in 1997 with a decision over Ryan Rhodes in England.  He vacated the belt following a defense against Ernesto Rafael Sena in 1998.

Fight vs Roy Jones Jr.
After a successful career thus far as the middleweight title holder, Grant vacated his belt to challenge prevailing champ Roy Jones Jr. in 1998 for the WBC and WBA light heavyweight titles, moving up two weight classes to make his debut in the light heavyweight division. The fighters decided on a catch-weight match, with Grant and Jones Jr. coming into the ring at 172 lbs (78 kg)and 171 lbs (77.56 kg), respectively. Grant had been a large underdog coming into the fight. Jones Jr. had the upper hand throughout the match up, earning knock downs in the 6th and 10th rounds. After his second knock down in the 10th round, Grant's trainer Russ Anber threw in the towel, giving Jones Jr. the TKO victory.

Comeback
Following Grant's near-fatal car crash in 1999, doctors stated that although his superb condition saved his life, he would be unable to continue boxing. Nevertheless, Grant was determined to make a return to the ring in search of another title shot as a super middleweight. After a 4-year hiatus, he had his first fight back against Dingaan Thobela(40-10-2), defeating him convincingly in 8 rounds. Grant continued his winning streak for another straight 6 fights, until he faced off against Librado Andrade (23-0) in 2006 for the WBC Super Middleweight number 1 contender position. After being beat throughout the fight, Grant's team elected to sit out at the 8th round, giving Andrade the victory and the title shot. Grant chose this opportunity to retire, stating that it was now his time to “bow out, and bow out gracefully”.

Personal life

Education
Grant took up post-secondary studies at Vanier College, eventually becoming one of their most well-known alumni. Following his cegep graduation, he enrolled in Concordia University and earned a BA in recreation and leisure studies, becoming a member of their class of ‘93.

Accident
In June 1999, Grant was involved in a dangerous collision during a road trip back to Montreal. Grant, who was the driver of the car, noticed an oncoming vehicle travelling north on a southbound lane and swerved towards the right to avoid contact for the passengers, but took the car's full impact on the driver's side. Passengers included former pro boxer Hercules Kyvelos and his then 6-year-old daughter. All were rushed to the emergency room in separate ambulances, although the passengers were virtually unscathed. Once recognizing that his daughter was safe at the hospital, Grant slipped into a coma for seven days. Other injuries sustained during the crash included five broken ribs, a punctured lung, and a shattered shoulder blade, all on his left hand side. This accident came only six months after vacating his WBO (World Boxing Organization) title belt. Once reviewed by doctors, Grant was essentially told he would never be able to return to the ring. Despite this, he made his official comeback in 2003, earning a unanimous decision victory over former world champion Dingaan Thobela.

Community work
After being approached by an organization to loan his name for charity, Grant became convinced to use his name to aid the needy. Thus, the Otis Grant & Friends foundation was created. The Otis Grant & Friends is a non profit charity, established in 1999, initially formed to aid hunger, poverty and sicknesses within the community. The organization has grown generously, now donating food, clothes and medicine to communities all across Canada. In addition to this, the organization sends children to summer camps whose families can't afford it, gives aid to special needs students at the high school level, as well as providing scholarships to graduating high school students who plan on post-secondary studies.

Grant also spends time working as a teacher's assistant and counsellor for special needs students at Lindsay Place, a local high school in Montreal, helping them adjust to school life. He is currently the coordinator at the community learning centre at Riverdale high school.

For all of his actions and benevolence towards the community, Otis Grant had been named the 2007 Concordia Alumnus of the year.

Future outside the ring
Otis Grant, along with his brother Howard Grant, own a boxing gym in Dollard-Des-Ormeaux, Montreal, named Grant Brothers Boxing where he coaches and manages amateur boxing events and also professional events in association with Rixa Promotions and Groupe Yvon Michel. he is also involved in two boxing brands: Grant Boxing and GBB. He is married to Betty Mullins and has two children Alexandria and Andrew. He lives with his family in Montreal, Quebec, Canada.

The professional boxing gloves he helped develop ranked as the best gloves in term of protection with an average of 0.0005% ratio of injuries while according to the John Hopkin's Medical School is 3.6%.

Professional boxing record

See also
List of middleweight boxing champions

References

External links
 

1967 births
Living people
Jamaican emigrants to Canada
Black Canadian boxers
Canadian male boxers
Middleweight boxers
Super-middleweight boxers
World middleweight boxing champions
World Boxing Organization champions
Boxers at the 1987 Pan American Games
Pan American Games medalists in boxing
Pan American Games silver medalists for Canada
Boxers from Montreal
Anglophone Quebec people
People from Saint Ann Parish
Medalists at the 1987 Pan American Games